Serbia elects a legislature and a president on a national level. The National Assembly of Serbia (Narodna skupština Republike Srbije) has 250 members elected for a four-year term. Serbia has a multi-party system, with numerous parties in which no one party often has a chance of gaining power alone, and parties must work with each other to form coalition governments. A party must receive at least 3% (lowered from 5% in 2020) of the votes in the entire country to qualify for any seats, except for national minorities' parties, who only have to reach 0.4%.

Results

Presidential elections

Parliamentary elections

Vojvodina provincial elections

See also
 Electoral calendar
 Electoral system

References

External links
Adam Carr's Election Archive
Parties and Elections in Europe